Gethin Creagh is a New Zealand sound engineer. He was nominated for an Academy Award in the category Best Sound for the film The Lord of the Rings: The Fellowship of the Ring. He has worked on more than 130 films, TV dramas and documentaries since 1967.

Selected filmography
 The Lord of the Rings: The Fellowship of the Ring (2001)

References

External links

Year of birth missing (living people)
Living people
New Zealand audio engineers